CLK-1, clk1, or variation, may refer to:

 , post-World War II light cruiser reclassified as a heavy destroyer
 clk-1 (gene), the clock-1 gene for ubiquinone biosynthesis encoding DMQ hydroxylase
 CLK1 (protein), the human enzyme dual specificity protein kinase CLK1, encoded by the CLK1 gene

See also

 
 
 CLK (disambiguation)